The General Staff of the Armed Forces of Azerbaijan Republic is the military staff of the Azerbaijani Armed Forces. It is the central organ of the Armed Forces Administration and oversees operational management of the armed forces under the Ministry of Defense of Azerbaijan Republic. The Chief of the General Staff is appointed by the President of Azerbaijan, who is the supreme commander-in-chief of the armed forces.

History 
It was founded as the Ümumi qərargah by the order of Samad bey Mehmandarov on 15 November 1918. Then, Colonel Habib Bey Salimov, Chief of Staff of the 424th Corps of Azerbaijan, was appointed Chief of the General Staff. The headquarters consisted of equipment, fortification, general on duty, general quartermaster, artillery, medicine, military education and control departments. By the end of the month, the General Staff moved to Ganja and continued its activities there. By the order of the Minister of War dated on New Year's Eve, the General Artillery Department was established on the basis of the artillery department, and this structure was removed from the General Staff and subordinated directly to the Minister of Defense. In March 1919, by order of the Minister of War, Erkani-Harb (General Staff) was created. In this connection, the quartermaster general and topographic departments were taken from the General Staff and given to the Armed Forces.

In 2008, a new structure of the General Staff was determined, accelerating NATO integration. It gained powers previously held by the MoD, turning the General Staff into a semi-independent structure. According to the corresponding report, the Inspection Department of the Ministry, as well as the Military Commissariat were re-subordinated to the General Staff. The existing Organizational Mobilization Department of the General Staff was abolished and merged with the Military Commissariat. A Land Forces Command in was also created in accordance with the Turkish model. According to the Defense Ministry's press service, a meeting of the Azerbaijani Defense Ministry's working group with experts of the Allied Command Transformation was held in Baku to discuss the separation of the General Staff structure from the Ministry of Defense.

The General Staff itself was then divided into six main departments:

 General Directorate of Personnel Management
 General Intelligence Agency
 General Operations and Combat Training Department
 Support Forces Command
 General Directorate of Defense Planning
 General Directorate of Communications and Information Systems

On 26 July 2014, a groundbreaking ceremony for a new and modern office building for the General Staff Headquarter was held at the Ministry of Defense, attended by Defense Minister Colonel-General Zakir Hasanov.

Members of the General Staff
Chief of the General Staff (head) - Karim Valiyev
Deputy Chief of the General Staff and Chief of the Main Operational Department 
Deputy Chief of the General Staff and Chief of the Department of Ideological Work and Moral and Psychological Support
National Advisor on Military Issues to the President of Azerbaijan - Lieutenant General Vahid Aliyev (2012-2017)
Commander of the Azerbaijani Land Forces - Lieutenant General Anvar Afandiyev
Commander of the Azerbaijani Navy - Rear Admiral Subhan Bekirov
Commander of the Azerbaijani Air Force - Lieutenant General Ramiz Tahirov

List of Chiefs of the General Staff

Azerbaijan Democratic Republic (1918−1920)

For period from 1920 to 1992, see Chief of the General Staff of the Soviet Union.

Azerbaijan Republic (1991−present)

See also
Military history of Azerbaijan
Azerbaijani Navy
Azerbaijani Air Forces

References

Military of Azerbaijan
1991 establishments in Azerbaijan
Azerbaijan